San Leone was a town and Catholic bishopric in Calabria, southern Italy, which remains a Latin titular see.

Ecclesiastical history 
 In 1322 the bishopric was established as Diocese of San Leone (Curiate Italian) / Sancti Leonis (Latin adjective)
 TO ELABORATE from the Italian Wiki

 Suppressed on 1571.11.27, its territory being merged into the Metropolitan Archdiocese of Santa Severina.

Episcopal ordinaries 
(all Roman Rite)

Suffragan Bishops of San Leone 
 Giovanni (1322? – ?)
 Luca (? – death 1349)
 Adamo da Cimiliario, Italian Basilian Order of Grottaferrata (O.S.B.I.) (1349 – death 1349.10.12)
 Giovanni (? – death 1391)
 Nicola de Lorenzo, Augustinians (O.E.S.A.) (1391.06.05 – death 1400?)
 Giacomo Villani (1400 – 1400.10.07), later Metropolitan Archbishop of Santa Severina (Italy) (1400.10.07 – death 1410)
 Antonio, Conventual Friars Minor (O.F.M. Conv.) (1402.08.18 – ?)
  Antonio, O.F.M. (1402.08.18 – ?); previously Bishop of Segni (Italy) (1395.12.21 – 1402.08.18)
 Geminiano Giovanni de Sochefani, O.E.S.A. (1404.12.10 – ?)
 Nicola (? – death 1439)
 Guberto de Nichesola (1439.04.22 – ?)
 Giovanni Domenico (? – death 1490)
 Giovanni (1490.06.07 – ?)
 Matteo de Amatis (? – death 1518)
 Giuliano Dati (1518.02.26 – death 1524)
 Francesco Sperolo (1524.01.19 – 1526.01.19)
 Anselmo Sperolo, O.F.M. Conv. (1526.01.19 – 1531)
 Avanzio Cricche (1531.01.18 – death 1535)
 Ottaviano de Castello (1535.01.08 – death 1542)
 Tommaso Caselli, O.P. (1542.12.11 – 1544.10.27); later Bishop of Bertinoro (Italy) (1544.10.27 – 1548.05.07), Bishop of Oppido Mamertina (Italy) (1548.05.07 – 1550.10.03), Bishop of Cava (Italy) (1550.10.03 – 1571)
 Marco Salvidio (1544.11.14 – death 1555)
 Giulio Pavesi, Dominican Order (O.P.) (1555.08.23 – 1555.10.02); later Bishop of Vieste (Italy) (1555.10.02 – 1558.07.20), Metropolitan Archbishop of Sorrento (Italy) (1558.07.20 – death 1571.02.11)
 Giulio Rossi (1555.10.23 – death 1564.03)
 Alvaro Magelanes (1565.05.15 – 1571.11.27 see suppressed)

Titular see 
In 1968 the diocese was nominally restored as Latin Titular bishopric, of the Episcopal (lowest) rank.

It has had the following incumbents, mostly of fitting episcopal rank, with some exceptions of archiepiscopal rank:
 Eugène-Georges-Joseph Lecrosnier (1969.04.21 – 1979.11.03) as Auxiliary Bishop of Archdiocese of Chambéry–Saint-Jean-de-Maurienne–Tarentaise (France) (1969.04.21 – 1979.11.03); later Bishop of Belfort–Montbéliard (France) (1979.11.03 – retired 2000.03.01); died 2013
 Stanisław Napierała (1980.08.25 – 1992.03.25) as Auxiliary Bishop of Archdiocese of Poznań (Posen, Poland) (1980.08.25 – 1992.03.25); later first Bishop of Kalisz (Poland) (1992.03.25 – retired 2012.07.21)
 Jacques Maurice Faivre (1992.04.29 – 1997.07.29) as Auxiliary Bishop of Archdiocese of Lyon (France) (1992.04.29 – 1997.07.29); later Bishop of Le Mans (France) (1997.07.29 – retired 2008.07.03), died 2010
 Stanisław Dziwisz) (1998.02.07 – personal promotion 2003.09.29 see below) first as Private Secretary of the Pope John Paul II (1978.10.16 – 2005.04.02), then as Adjunct Prefect of Prefecture of the Papal Household (1998.02.07 – 2005.06.03); previously Protonotary Apostolic de numero of Prefecture of the Papal Household (1996.09.28 – 1998.02.07)
 Titular Archbishop: the same Stanisław Dziwisz (see above 2003.09.29 – 2005.06.03); later Metropolitan Archbishop of Kraków (Krakau, Poland) (2005.06.03 – 2016.12.08), created Cardinal-Priest of S. Maria del Popolo (2006.03.24 [2006.10.24] – ...)
 Víctor Manuel Ochoa Cadavid (2006.01.24 – 2011.01.24) as Auxiliary Bishop of Archdiocese of Medellin (Colombia) (2006.01.24 – 2011.01.24); later Bishop of Málaga–Soatá (Colombia) (2011.01.24 – 2015.07.24), Bishop of Cúcuta (Colombia) (2015.07.24 – ...)
 Titular Archbishop: Prosper Grech, Augustinians (O.S.A.) (born Malta) (2012.01.21 – 2012.02.18), without actual prelature; later created Cardinal-Deacon of S. Maria Goretti (2012.02.18 [2012.04.21] – ...)
 Charles Jude Scicluna (2012.10.06 – 2015.02.27) as Auxiliary Bishop of Archdiocese of Malta (Malta) (2012.10.06 – 2015.02.27) and Apostolic Administrator of the same Malta (2014.10.18 – 2015.02.27); previously Substitute Promoter of Justice of Supreme Tribunal of the Apostolic Signatura (1996 – 2002.10.21), Promoter of Justice of Congregation for the Doctrine of the Faith (2002.10.21 – 2012.10.06); later President of College for the review of appeals by clergy accused of delicta graviora (2015.01.21 – ...), Metropolitan Archbishop of above Malta (2015.02.27 – ...), President of Episcopal Conference of Malta (2016.08.20 – ...)
 George Bugeja, Friars Minor (O.F.M.) (born Malta) (2015.07.10 – ...), Coadjutor Apostolic Vicar of Tripoli (Libya) (2015.07.10 – succession 2017.02.05); later Apostolic Administrator of Apostolic Vicariate of Benghazi (Libya) (2016.02.14 – ...), promoted Apostolic Vicar of above Tripoli (2017.02.05 – ...).

Sources and external links 
 GCathholic, with Google satellite photo - data for all sections

Catholic titular sees in Europe
Former Roman Catholic dioceses in Italy
Suppressed Roman Catholic dioceses